Henry Elbert DeBolt (October 2, 1888 – March 8, 1969) was a provincial politician from Alberta, Canada. He served as a member of the Legislative Assembly of Alberta from 1940 to 1952, sitting as a Social Credit member from the constituency of Spirit River. The Alberta community of DeBolt is named after him.

References

1969 deaths
1888 births
Alberta Social Credit Party MLAs